Himanshu Dhanuka is an Indian film producer and distributor. Himanshu is the head of Eskay Movies.

Personal life 
Himanshu, the elder son of producer and distributor Ashok Dhanuka. He completed his graduation in Mechanical Engineering from National Institute of Technology. Kurukshetra. He  married  Shristy Tibrewal in the month of October, 2013.

Career 
Himanshu started his career at the young age of 23 as a producer along with his father, Ashok Dhanuka on films like Bhalobasha Bhalobasha(2008), Dujone (2009), Wanted (2010), Khiladi (2013) and many others. Bhalobasha Bhalobasha remained as the first Bengali film which was shot outside Asia and South East Asia, the film was one of the highest grossing Bengali films in 2008. Himanshu then produced films like Khokababu, Ami Sudhu Cheyechi Tomay Romeo vs Juliet, Khoka 420, Shotru,  Badshah the Don, and Shikari.

Filmography
 Tui Sudhu Amar (2018)
 Doob: No Bed of Roses (2017)
 The Bongs Again (2017)
 Prem Ki Bujhini (2016)
 Badsha The Don (2016)
 Kiriti Roy (2016)
 Hero 420 (2016)
 Shikari (2016) 
 Aashiqui (2015)
 Romeo vs Juliet (2015)
 Ami Shudhu Cheyechi Tomay (2014)
 Khiladi (2013)
 Kanamachi (2013)
 Khoka 420 (2013)
 Khokababu (2012)
 Idiot (2012)
 Shotru (2011)
 Wanted (2010)

References

External links
 
 
 Himanshu Dhanuka in Gomolo

Living people
Film producers from Haryana
Bengali film producers
Indian Hindus
Bengali Hindus
Year of birth missing (living people)